Aleksandr Alekseyevich Ivankov (born 12 January 2000) is a Russian football player. He plays for FC SKA-Khabarovsk.

Club career
He made his debut in the Russian Football National League for FC Metallurg Lipetsk on 25 July 2021 in a game against FC Akron Tolyatti.

References

External links
 
 
 Profile by Russian Football National League

2000 births
Footballers from Saint Petersburg
Living people
Russian footballers
Russia youth international footballers
Association football defenders
FC Rubin Kazan players
FC Metallurg Lipetsk players
FC SKA-Khabarovsk players
Russian First League players
Russian Second League players